Don Taylor Udall (July 20, 1897 – March 14, 1976) was a member of the Arizona State Legislature from the Udall political family.

Born and raised in Arizona, he was the son of David King Udall and Ida Frances (Hunt) Udall.

He graduated from Georgetown University with a law degree, and was admitted to the Arizona Bar in 1923. From 1941–1942 he was a member of the Arizona State Legislature. During World War II, he served as a Lieutenant Colonel in the U.S. Army Judge Advocate Generals Corps, with duty in the South Pacific. Later he was elected as a Judge of the Arizona Superior Court.

He died in Mesa, Arizona, in 1976. He is buried in the Holbrook Cemetery in Holbrook, Arizona.

References 
 Arizona Pioneer Mormon: David King Udall, His Story and His Family
 Mo Udall Speech: "Mormon Settlement in Arizona," Heard Museum, Phoenix, Arizona, February 18, 1971

1897 births
1976 deaths
American Latter Day Saints
United States Army personnel of World War II
Georgetown University Law Center alumni
Members of the Arizona House of Representatives
People from Apache County, Arizona
Udall family
20th-century American politicians
United States Army colonels
United States Army Judge Advocate General's Corps